The following lists events that happened during 1962 in Iran.

Incumbents
 Shah: Mohammad Reza Pahlavi 
 Prime Minister: Ali Amini (until July 19), Asadollah Alam (starting July 19)

Events

 1 September – the 7.1  Buin Zahra earthquake shook northern Iran with a maximum Mercalli intensity of IX (Violent), killing at least 12,225 and injuring 2,776.

Births

 5 September – Masoumeh Abad, writer, university professor, politician and activist
 14 September – Zahra Dowlatabadi.
 19 December – Kamshad Kooshan.

References

 
Iran
Years of the 20th century in Iran
1960s in Iran
Iran